The 2013 Piala Emas Raja–Raja, also known as the 2013 Piala Emas Raja–Raja in Malay, will be held from 8 November to 21 December 2013 at four different host venues namely Perlis, Kelantan, Johor and Selangor in Malaysia. Perak are the defending champions.

The Piala Emas Raja–Raja is one of the oldest and prestigious tournaments in the world with its first edition dating back to 1922. His Royal Highness the Regent of England Prince of Wales visited the East and this tournament was held in celebration in Singapore by Malaya's national footballing body Football Association of Malaysia.

Teams
The participating teams usually include representatives of the state teams of Malaysia and neighbouring country Singapore. Fifteen teams will compete for the trophy in this edition.

The fifteen teams are divided into a group of three and three groups of four, and they will play in a single round-robin format. The top two teams of each group will advance into the knockout stage which will be played in a single elimination format.

  Angkatan Tentara Malaysia
  Johor
  Kedah
  Kelantan
  Kuala Lumpur
  Malaysian University Sports Council (MASUM)
  Malacca
  Negeri Sembilan
  Pahang
  Perak
  Perlis
  PDRM
  Selangor
  Singapore Malays
  Terengganu

Take note that Singapore Malays are not the Singapore Lions, and they do not represent the Football Association of Singapore in this tournament.

Venues

Round and draw dates

Group stage

The draw for the group stage was held in Kuala Lumpur on 26 October 2013. The 15 teams were allocated into three groups of four and a group of three. A total of two football associations under one confederation are represented in the group stage.

In each group, teams will play against each other once in a single round-robin format. The matchdays were 8–9 November, 9–10 November and 10–11 November 2013. The group winners and runners-up will advance to the round of 16.

Group A

Group B

Group C

Group D

Knockout phase
In the knockout phase, teams will play against each other over two legs on a home-and-away basis, except for the one-match final.

Bracket

Quarter-finals
The first legs will be played on 16 November 2013, and the second legs will be played on 23 November 2013.

|}

First leg

Second leg

Semi-finals
The first legs will be played on 30 November 2013, and the second legs will be played on 7 December 2013.

|}

First leg

Second leg

Final

The final will be played on 29 December 2013 at Darul Aman Stadium in Kedah, Malaysia.

Winners

References

Piala Emas Raja–Raja seasons
2013 in Singaporean football
2013 in Malaysian football